Bled White is the ninth studio album by the heavy metal band Novembers Doom. It was released in 2014 on The End Records.

Track listing

Personnel
Novembers Doom
 Paul Kuhr – vocals, photography
 Mike Feldman – bass
 Vito Marchese – guitars
 Larry Roberts – guitars, vocals
 Garry Naples – drums

Additional personnel and staff
 Dan Swanö – backing vocals (track 5)
 Ben Johnson – keyboards

References 

2014 albums
Novembers Doom albums
The End Records albums